Cochecton Railroad Station is a historic train station located at Cochecton in Sullivan County, New York.  It was built about 1850 by the Erie Railroad as a freight house.  It is a large, 1-story frame building with Greek Revival style details. The -story, rectangular building measures 30 feet wide and 50 feet deep and is topped by a gable roof. The last passenger trains at Cocheton were unnamed trains from Hoboken, New Jersey to Binghamton timed to meet up with the Phoebe Snow.

It is the oldest surviving station in New York state.  It was moved from its original site in the early 1990s to be saved from demolition.

It was added to the National Register of Historic Places in 2005.

References

Railway stations on the National Register of Historic Places in New York (state)
Railway stations in the United States opened in 1850
Transportation buildings and structures in Sullivan County, New York
Former Erie Railroad stations
National Register of Historic Places in Sullivan County, New York
Former railway stations in New York (state)
1850 establishments in New York (state)